Alternate Presidents is an alternate history anthology edited by Mike Resnick, published in the United States by Tor Books. There are 28 stories in the anthology, including Resnick's own "The Bull Moose at Bay". The other remaining stories are by different authors, and present scenarios where an individual becomes President of the United States in a way that did not occur in real life. The anthology was released on February 15, 1992.

Stories

See also
 List of works by Mike Resnick
 Lists of fictional presidents of the United States

References

External links
 Internet Book List entry
 Dispatches From the Revolution

1992 books
Alternate history anthologies
Fictional presidents of the United States
Books about presidents of the United States
Books about Benjamin Franklin
Tor Books books
Works about elections
Cultural depictions of John Adams
Cultural depictions of John Quincy Adams
Cultural depictions of Samuel Adams
Cultural depictions of Susan B. Anthony
Cultural depictions of Chester A. Arthur
Cultural depictions of John Wilkes Booth
Cultural depictions of John Brown (abolitionist)
Cultural depictions of James Buchanan
Cultural depictions of George H. W. Bush
Cultural depictions of Jimmy Carter
Cultural depictions of Dick Cheney
Cultural depictions of Davy Crockett
Cultural depictions of George Armstrong Custer
Cultural depictions of Frederick Douglass
Cultural depictions of Dwight D. Eisenhower
Cultural depictions of Gerald Ford
Cultural depictions of Benjamin Franklin
Cultural depictions of James A. Garfield
Cultural depictions of Hermann Göring
Cultural depictions of Ulysses S. Grant
Cultural depictions of Alexander Hamilton
Cultural depictions of John Hancock
Cultural depictions of Warren G. Harding
Cultural depictions of Adolf Hitler
Cultural depictions of Herbert Hoover
Cultural depictions of J. Edgar Hoover
Cultural depictions of John F. Kennedy
Cultural depictions of Robert F. Kennedy
Cultural depictions of Jacqueline Kennedy Onassis
Cultural depictions of Ruhollah Khomeini
Cultural depictions of Martin Luther King Jr.
Cultural depictions of Henry Kissinger
Cultural depictions of Robert E. Lee
Cultural depictions of Abraham Lincoln
Cultural depictions of James Madison
Cultural depictions of Joseph McCarthy
Cultural depictions of Marilyn Monroe
Cultural depictions of Napoleon
Cultural depictions of Richard Nixon
Cultural depictions of J. Robert Oppenheimer
Cultural depictions of Ronald Reagan
Cultural depictions of Eleanor Roosevelt
Cultural depictions of Franklin D. Roosevelt
Cultural depictions of Theodore Roosevelt
Cultural depictions of Julius and Ethel Rosenberg
Cultural depictions of Harry S. Truman
Cultural depictions of Queen Victoria
Cultural depictions of George Washington
Cultural depictions of Arthur Wellesley, 1st Duke of Wellington
United States presidential succession in fiction
American Civil War alternate histories
World War I alternate histories
World War II alternate histories
Fiction set in the 1780s
Fiction set in the 1790s
Fiction set in the 1800s
Fiction set in the 1810s
Fiction set in the 1820s
Fiction set in the 1830s
Fiction set in the 1840s
Fiction set in the 1850s
Fiction set in the 1860s
Fiction set in the 1870s
Fiction set in the 1880s
Fiction set in the 1890s
Fiction set in the 1900s
Fiction set in the 1910s
Fiction set in the 1920s
Fiction set in the 1930s
Fiction set in the 1940s
Fiction set in the 1950s
Fiction set in the 1960s
Fiction set in the 1970s
Fiction set in the 1980s
Fiction set in the 1990s
Alien visitations in fiction
Fiction about time travel
Vietnam War fiction
Fiction about nuclear war and weapons
Totalitarianism in fiction
Cultural depictions of Zachary Taylor
21st-century American women